Whiteness may refer to:
 Dental shade scale of teeth
 Light skin
 Whiteness (colorimetry), the degree to which a surface is white
 Whiteness, Shetland, a place in Scotland
 Conceptual studies of "Unified Cultural Identity of White People" (Whiteness theory):
 Whiteness studies, an interdisciplinary academic field, exploring the identity of whiteness
 Definitions of whiteness in the United States, the relationship between different U.S. ethnic groups around the concept of whiteness